Hişgədərə kendi (also, Hişkədərə, Khashka-Dara, talis dilinde Qurudere menasini verir) is a village and municipality in the Masally District, Azerbaijan. It has a population of 2,536.

References 

Populated places in Masally District